Choi Jung-woo (born February 17, 1957) is a South Korean actor. He began his acting career in theater, then became active as a supporting actor in film and television, notably in the sitcom Standby and the procedural dramas Quiz of God and Dr. Frost.

Filmography

Film

Television series

Theater

Awards and nominations

References

External links 
 
 
 

1957 births
Living people
South Korean male television actors
South Korean male film actors
South Korean male stage actors
20th-century South Korean male actors
21st-century South Korean male actors